Copts in Canada are Canadian citizens of Coptic descent or people of Coptic descent residing in Canada.

Population and distribution
According to the 2011 Census there were 3,570 Canadians who reported Coptic ancestry (this figure combines single and multiple ethnic origin responses). Of this number, 755 Canadians reported Coptic as their only ancestry, whereas 2,810 reported Coptic as one of multiple ancestries.

In the same survey, 16,255 Canadians said they belonged to the Coptic Orthodox church. Of this number, 12,645 were immigrants and 3,365 were born in Canada.

The Canadian Coptic Association estimates that there are 35,000 Copts living in Canada; according to CBC News, "if other sects with strong ties to the Coptic community are included, the figure is possibly higher still." (Note: There is likely a typo in the CBC article where an extra zero was added, thereby erroneous stating that there are 350,000 Copts in Canada).

Toronto and the surrounding metropolitan region have the largest concentration of Copts in Canada.

Immigration history

The immigration of the Copts to Canada might have started as early as the late 1950s. Due to an increasing amount of discrimination towards Copts in Egypt in the 1970s, many decided to emigrate in order to escape the rising racial tensions. Canada has been receiving a greater number of these immigrants, and the number of Coptic immigrants into Canada has been growing ever since.

Coptic Orthodox Church in Canada

In 1964, St. Mark Coptic Orthodox Church was established in Toronto; this was the first Coptic church established in the Coptic diaspora.

In 2002, a survey showed 22 Coptic Orthodox parishes in Canada, indicating growth.

In 2011, there were five Coptic Orthodox churches in Montreal.

Notable Coptic Canadians
Manuel Tadros – singer, songwriter, actor, comedian and voice actor
Xavier Dolan – filmmaker
Mena Massoud – actor
Samer Bishay - entrepreneur

See also 
Middle Eastern Canadians
List of Coptic Orthodox Churches in Canada
Copts
Coptic diaspora
Coptic Americans
Coptic Australians
Copts in Egypt
Copts in Sudan
Copts in Libya

References 

Ethnic groups in Canada
 
Coptic diaspora in North America